Asian Highway 51 or AH51 is a route located entirely in Pakistan, running  from Peshawar, Khyber Pakhtunkhwa Province to Quetta, Balochistan Province.

Route 
 Peshawar - Dera Ismail Khan : 
 Dera Ismail Khan - Quetta :

Junctions
  near Peshawar
  near Quetta

See also
 Asian Highway 1
 List of Asian Highways

References

External links
 Treaty on Asian Highways with routes

Asian Highway Network
Roads in Pakistan